Leysya, Pesnya   (literally "Flow, song") was a Soviet Vocal and instrumental ensemble active during the 1970s and 1980s.

It was founded in 1975 by Valery Seleznev in the city of Kemerovo.

Some of the earliest singers in Leysya, Pesnya included Mikhail   Shufutinsky, Vlad Andrianov, Vladimir Efimenko, Igor Ivanov and Yuri Zakharov.

In 1980, Vitaly Cretu took over as the director, and several of the original members left while new ones took over. 

The original Lesya, Pesnya was disbanded in 1984.

Discography 

These albums are listed first in Russian, followed by an English translation of the album's name, followed by the year it was made in.

 Шире круг (Wider Range, 1979)
 Песни на стихи Михаила Пляцковского (Songs on the Poetry of Mikhail Plyatskovsky, 1981)
 Танцевальный час (Dancing Hour, 1982)
 Сегодня и вчера (Yesterday and Today, 1982)
 Радио — лучше всего (Radio is the Best, 1983)

References

External links
 

1975 establishments in Russia
1984 disestablishments in Russia
Russian musical groups
Russian pop music groups
Musical groups established in 1975
Musical groups disestablished in 1984
Soviet pop music groups